Camillo Paolo Filippo Giulio Benso, Count of Cavour, Isolabella and Leri (10 August 1810 – 6 June 1861), generally known as Cavour, was an Italian politician, businessman, economist and noble, and a leading figure in the movement towards Italian unification. He was one of the leaders of the Historical Right and prime minister of the Kingdom of Piedmont–Sardinia, a position he maintained (except for a six-month resignation) throughout the Second Italian War of Independence and Giuseppe Garibaldi's campaigns to unite Italy. After the declaration of a united Kingdom of Italy, Cavour took office as the first prime minister of Italy; he died after only three months in office and did not live to see the Roman Question solved through the complete unification of the country after the Capture of Rome in 1870.

Cavour put forth several economic reforms in his native region of Piedmont, at that time part of the Kingdom of Sardinia, in his earlier years and founded the political newspaper Il Risorgimento. After being elected to the Chamber of Deputies, he quickly rose in rank through the Piedmontese government, coming to dominate the Chamber of Deputies through a union of centre-left and centre-right politicians. After a large rail system expansion program, Cavour became prime minister in 1852. As prime minister, Cavour successfully negotiated Piedmont's way through the Crimean War, the Second Italian War of Independence, and Garibaldi's Expedition of the Thousand, managing to maneuver Piedmont diplomatically to become a new great power in Europe, controlling a nearly united Italy that was five times as large as Piedmont had been before he came to power. Cavour was a Freemason of the Italian Symbolic Rite.

English historian Denis Mack Smith says Cavour was the most successful parliamentarian in Italian history, but he was not especially democratic. Cavour was often dictatorial, ignored his ministerial colleagues and parliament, and interfered in parliamentary elections. He also practiced trasformismo and other policies which were carried over into post-Risorgimento Italy.

Biography

Early life
Cavour was born in Turin during Napoleonic rule, into a family which had acquired estates during the French occupation. He was the second of two sons of Michele Giuseppe Francesco Antonio Benso, 4th Marquess of Cavour and Count of Isolabella and Leri, Lord of Corveglia, Dusino, Mondonio, Ottiglio and Ponticelli, Co-Lord of Castagnole, Cellarengo and Menabi, Cereaglio, Chieri, San Salvatore Monferrato, Santena and Valfenera, 1st Baron of the French Empire (1781–1850) and his wife (1805) Adélaïde (Adèle) Suzanne, Marchioness of Sellon (1780–1846), herself of French origin. His godparents were Napoleon's sister Pauline, and her husband, Prince Camillo Borghese, after whom Camillo was named.

Camillo and his older brother Gustavo were initially educated at home. He was sent to the Turin Military Academy when he was only ten years old. In July 1824 he was named a page to Charles Albert, the king of Piedmont (1831–1849). Cavour frequently ran afoul of the authorities in the academy, as he was too headstrong to deal with the rigid military discipline. He was once forced to live three days on bread and water because he had been caught with books that the academy had banned. He was found to be apt at the mathematical disciplines, and was therefore enlisted in the Engineer Corps in the Piedmontese-Sardinian army in 1827. While in the army, he studied the English language as well as the works of Jeremy Bentham and Benjamin Constant, developing liberal tendencies which made him suspect to police forces at the time. He resigned his commission in the army in November 1831, both because of boredom with military life and because of his dislike of the reactionary policies of King Charles Albert. He administered the family estate at Grinzane, some forty kilometers outside the capital, serving as mayor there from 1832 to the revolutionary upheaval of 1848.

Cavour then lived for a time in Switzerland, with his relatives in Geneva. He then traveled to Paris where he was impressed by parliamentary debates, especially those of François Guizot and Adolphe Thiers, confirming his devotion to a political career. He next went to London, where he was much more disappointed by British politics, and toured the country, visiting Oxford, Liverpool, Birmingham, Chester, Nottingham, and Manchester. A quick tour through the Netherlands, Germany, and Switzerland (the German part and the Lake Geneva area) eventually landed him back in Turin.

Cavour believed that economic progress had to precede political change, and stressed the advantages of railroad construction in the peninsula. He was a strong supporter of transportation by steam engine, sponsoring the building of many railroads and canals. Between 1838 and 1842 Cavour began several initiatives in attempts to solve economic problems in his area. He experimented with different agricultural techniques on his estate, such as growing sugar beets, and was one of the first Italian landowners to use chemical fertilizers. He also founded the Piedmontese Agricultural Society. In his spare time, he again traveled extensively, mostly in France and the United Kingdom.

Early political career

The first apparently liberal moves of Pope Pope Pius IX and the Revolutions of 1848 spawned a new movement of Italian liberalism, allowing Cavour to enter the political arena, no longer in fear of the police. He then gave a speech in front of numerous journalists in favor of a constitution for Piedmont, which was eventually granted. Cavour, unlike several other political thinkers, was not at first offered a position in the new Chamber of Deputies, as he was still a somewhat suspicious character to the nation.

Cavour never planned for the establishment of a united country, and even later during his Premiership his objective was to expand Piedmont with the annexation of Lombardy and Venetia, rather than a unified Italy. For example, during the conservative period, he gained a reputation as a non-revolutionary progressive. He was a poor public speaker.  Cavour then lost the next election, while the Piedmontese army was destroyed at the Battle of Novara, leading Charles Albert to abdicate, passing the throne to his son, Victor Emmanuel II.

Cavour was then brought back into Parliament by the voters, where he was much more successful. His knowledge of European markets and modern economics earned him the positions of Minister of Agriculture, Minister of Commerce, and Minister of the Navy in 1850. Cavour soon came to dominate the cabinet of Prime Minister Massimo d'Azeglio.  Cavour united the Right Center and the Left Center in the chamber to show dominance there as well. In 1851, Cavour gained a Cabinet promotion to Minister of Finance  by working against his colleague from inside the Cabinet in a somewhat disreputable takeover, although this was to Piedmont's advantage because of his many economic reforms. It allowed Cavour to begin his railway expansion program, giving Piedmont 800 kilometres of track by the year 1860, one third of the railways in Italy at the time.  He took the lead in legislation weakening the powers of the Church to own land, control the schools and supervise marriage laws.  When the bishops protested, they were punished or exiled, making Cavour the hero of liberal anticlerical elements across Italy.

Prime Minister of Piedmont–Sardinia

Cavour formed a coalition with Urbano Rattazzi known as the Connubio ("marriage"), uniting the moderate men of the Right and of the Left, and brought about the fall of the d'Azeglio cabinet in November 1852. The King reluctantly accepted Cavour as prime minister, the most conservative possible choice, but their relationship was never an easy one.

Cavour was generally liberal and believed in free trade, freedom of opinion, and secular rule, but he was an enemy of republicans and revolutionaries, whom he feared as disorganized radicals who would upset the social order. Cavour dominated debate in Parliament but is criticized for the controversial methods he used while Prime Minister, including excessive use of emergency powers, employing friends, bribing some newspapers while suppressing others, and rigging elections, though these were fairly common practices for the time. The national debt soared by a factor of six because of his heavy spending on modernizing projects, especially railways, and building up the army and the Royal Sardinian Navy. When he became Prime Minister Piedmont had just suffered a major defeat by Austria, but when he died, Victor Emmanuel II ruled a state five times as large, which dominated Italy and ranked among Europe's great powers.

The allied powers of Britain and France asked Piedmont to enter the Crimean War, partially to encourage Austria to enter, which it would not do unless it was certain that Piedmontese troops were not available to attack Austrian positions in Italy. Cavour, who hoped that the allies would support Piedmont's expansion in Italy, agreed as soon as his colleagues' support would allow and entered the war on 10 January 1855. This was too late to truly distinguish themselves militarily, but the 18,000 man contingent earned Piedmont a position at the Congress of Paris that ended the war.

In January 1858, the Italian Felice Orsini's attempted assassination of Napoleon III paradoxically opened an avenue of diplomacy between France and Piedmont. While in jail awaiting trial, Orsini wrote a public letter to the Emperor of the French, ending with, "Remember that, so long as Italy is not independent, the peace of Europe and Your Majesty is but an empty dream... Set my country free, and the blessings of twenty-five million people will follow you everywhere and forever." Orsini was still executed, but Napoleon III began to explore the possibility of joint operation with Piedmont against Austria. Cavour and Napoleon met in July 1858 at Plombières-les-Bains, and the two agreed that Piedmont would attempt to provoke war with the Duchy of Modena, obliging Austria to enter, and France would then aid Piedmont. In return, Cavour reluctantly agreed to cede Savoy (the seat of the Piedmontese royal family) and the  County of Nice to France, and also arranged a royal marriage between Princess Maria Clotilde of Savoy and Prince Napoléon Bonaparte, surprisingly without Victor Emmanuel's consent.
In the same year, Cavour sent his cousin, the famous beauty, photographic artist, and secret agent Virginia Oldoïni, to further the interests of Italian unification with the emperor by whatever means possible, and by all accounts she succeeded, famously becoming the mistress of Napoleon.

Both France and Piedmont began to prepare for war, but diplomatic support diminished rapidly. Napoleon III quickly soured on the plot, and Britain, Prussia, and Russia proposed an international congress, with one likely goal the disarmament of Piedmont. Piedmont was saved by Austria's sending an ultimatum on 23 April, demanding that Piedmont disarm itself, thus casting Austria as an aggressor. France mobilised and slowly began to enter Italy, but Piedmont needed to defend itself for a short period. Fortunately, rainstorms and Austrian indecision under Ferencz Graf Gyulai gave time for France to arrive in force.

The battles of Magenta and Solferino left Franco-Piedmontese forces in control of Lombardy, but the Austrians remained confident of defending their "fortress quadrilateral" area, with four fortresses in Verona, Legnago, Peschiera, and Mantua. These defenses, the horrors of the Battle of Solferino, the possibility of Prussian entry into the war, and the potential for an over-strong Piedmontese state convinced Napoleon to sign a separate peace with Austria in the Treaty of Villafranca on 11 July 1859, ending the Second Italian War of Independence. Victor Emmanuel accepted the peace, but Cavour was so infuriated after reading the terms of the treaty that he tendered his resignation. He soon regained his optimism, however, as several of the terms, such as the restoration to power of the rulers of Tuscany and Modena, and the establishment of an Italian Confederation including Austria, were not actually carried out.

General La Marmora succeeded to Cavour's post and insisted on following the treaty terms, even sending a letter to Tuscany asking that they restore their Grand Duke. Bettino Ricasoli, virtual dictator of Tuscany at the time, wrote about this appeal to his brother, saying: "Tell General La Marmora that I have torn his letter into a thousand pieces." France continued direct talks with Piedmont on the destiny of the central Italian states, all of whose autocrats supported unification with Piedmont but were restrained by the treaty, which called for the restoration of their old governments.

Cavour had retired to his estate at Leri, out of politics but concerned about the King's alliance with Garibaldi's revolutionaries and his desire to renew the war with Austria without allied support. When the weak La Marmora cabinet resigned, Victor Emmanuel was reluctant to have Cavour as premier again due both to their quarrel over the treaty of Villafranca and Cavour's success in preventing the king from marrying his mistress after the queen's death. But Cavour was sent for on 20 January 1860.

Cavour agreed with Napoleon to cede Savoy and Nice to France, in order to annex Tuscany and Emilia to Piedmont. Plebiscites were arranged with huge majorities in all these provinces to approve the changes. Cavour managed to convince most that uniting Italy would make up for these territorial losses. With this, the first stage of unification was completed. It was now up to Garibaldi to overthrow the Bourbon Kingdom of the Two Sicilies and bring southern Italy into Piedmont's control.

Garibaldi was furious that his birthplace, Nice, had been ceded to France, and wished to recapture the city, but a popular insurrection in Palermo on 4 April 1860 diverted him southward. He requested a brigade of Piedmontese to take Sicily, but Cavour refused. So instead, Garibaldi raised a force of a thousand (I Mille) redshirt volunteers. They landed at Marsala in Sicily on 11 May and won the battles of Calatafimi and Milazzo, gaining control of Sicily. Cavour attempted to annex Sicily to Piedmont, but Garibaldi and his comrade Francesco Crispi would not allow it.

Cavour persuaded Victor Emmanuel to write a letter to Garibaldi, requesting that he not invade the mainland; the letter was indeed sent, but the King secretly wished Garibaldi to invade. He wrote another letter asking him to go ahead, but this was apparently never sent. Cavour meanwhile attempted to stir up a liberal revolution in Naples, but the populace was unreceptive. Garibaldi invaded, attempting to reach Naples quickly before Cavour found a way to stop him. On 7 September he entered Naples, at that time the largest city in Italy, and unilaterally declared Victor Emmanuel the King of Italy. Garibaldi was now military dictator of southern Italy and Sicily, and he imposed the Piedmontese constitution but publicly demanded that Cavour be removed, which alienated him slightly from Victor Emmanuel.

Garibaldi was unwilling to stop at this point, and planned an immediate invasion of the Papal States. Cavour feared France in that case would declare war to defend the Pope and successfully stopped Garibaldi from initiating his attack. Garibaldi had been weakened by the Battle of Volturno, so Cavour quickly invaded the Papal regions of Umbria and Marche. This linked the territories conquered by Piedmont with those taken by Garibaldi. The King met with Garibaldi, who handed over control of southern Italy and Sicily, thus uniting Italy.

The relationship between Cavour and Garibaldi was always fractious: Cavour likened Garibaldi to "a savage" while Garibaldi memorably called Cavour "a low intriguer".

Prime Minister of Italy

In 1861, Victor Emmanuel II declared the Kingdom of Italy, making Cavour  Prime Minister of Italy. Cavour had many difficult issues to consider, including how to create a national military, which legal institutions should be retained in what locations, and especially the future of Rome. Most Italians thought Rome must be capital of a united Italy, but this conflicted with the temporal power of the Pope and also the independence of the Church. Cavour believed that Rome should remain the seat of "a free church in a free state", which would maintain its independence but give up temporal power. These issues would become known as the "Roman Question". Still Austrian Venetia was also a problem. Cavour recognized that Venice must be an integral part of Italy but refused to take a stance on how to achieve it, saying "Will the deliverance of Venice come by arms or diplomacy? I do not know. It is the secret of Providence." A motion approving of his foreign policy passed by a huge majority, basically only opposed by left-wing and right-wing extremist groups.

Creating Italy was no easy task, but ruling it proved a worse strain on the Prime Minister. In 1861, at the peak of his career, months of long days coupled with insomnia and constant worry took their toll on Cavour. He fell ill, presumably of malaria, and to make matters worse insisted upon being bled. His regular doctor would have refused, but he was not available; so Cavour was bled several times until it was nearly impossible to draw any blood from him. He was buried in Santena, near Turin.

After his death, Italy would gain Venice in 1866 in the course of the Third Italian War of Independence, connected to the Austro-Prussian War. The Capture of Rome completed the unification of Italy (aside from Trentino and Trieste) in 1870.

Legacy

Today, many Italian cities, including Turin, Trieste, Rome, Florence, and Naples, have important streets, squares, piazzas, and metro stations named after Cavour, as well as Mazzini and Garibaldi. The clipper ship, Camille Cavour, the battleship Conte di Cavour, which fought both in World War I and World War II, and the new Marina Militare aircraft carrier Cavour is also named in his honor.

In 1865, the Collegio dei Nobili, the oldest high school in Turin (founded 1568), and among the oldest and most prominent ones in Italy, was renamed the Liceo Ginnasio statale "Camillo Benso di Cavour" (Liceo classico Cavour).

See also 
History of Italy

References

Further reading 

 Beales, Derek & Eugenio Biagini. The Risorgimento and the Unification of Italy. Second Edition. London: Longman, 2002. 
 Braun, Martin. "'Great Expectations': Cavour and Garibaldi: 1859–1959.” History Today (Oct. 1959) 9#10 pp 687–692; historiography
 Dal Lago, Enrico. "Lincoln, Cavour, and National Unification: American Republicanism and Italian Liberal Nationalism in Comparative Perspective." Journal of the Civil War Era 3#1 (2013): 85–113.
 Di Scala, Spencer. Italy: From Revolution to Republic, 1700 to the Present. (Boulder, Westview Press, 2004. 
 Hearder, Harry. Cavour (1994)  excerpt, a scholarly biography
 Holt, Edgar. The Making of Italy: 1815–1870. New York: Murray Printing Company, 1971. 
 Kertzer, David. Prisoner of the Vatican. Boston: Houghton Mifflin Company, 2004. 
 Mack Smith, Denis. Cavour. New York: Alfred A. Knopf, 1985. , a scholarly biography, quite critical of Cavour online review; online review
 Mack Smith, Denis. Italy: A Modern History. Ann Arbor: The University of Michigan Press, 1959. 
 Martinengo-Cesaresco, Evelyn, Countess. Cavour, Fratelli Treves, Milano, 1901; Macmillan, London, 1904.
 Murtaugh, Frank M. Cavour and the Economic Modernization of the Kingdom of Sardinia (1991).  
 Norwich, John Julius. The Middle Sea: A History of the Mediterranean. New York: Doubleday, 2006. 
  old interpretations but useful on details; vol 1 goes to 1859]; volume 2 online covers 1859–62

External links
 

1810 births
1861 deaths
Politicians from Turin
Nobility from Turin
Counts of Italy
Italian Roman Catholics
Historical Right politicians
Prime ministers of the Kingdom of Sardinia
Prime Ministers of Italy
Foreign ministers of Italy
Deputies of Legislature I of the Kingdom of Sardinia
Deputies of Legislature II of the Kingdom of Sardinia
Deputies of Legislature III of the Kingdom of Sardinia
Deputies of Legislature IV of the Kingdom of Sardinia
Deputies of Legislature V of the Kingdom of Sardinia
Deputies of Legislature VI of the Kingdom of Sardinia
Deputies of Legislature VII of the Kingdom of Sardinia
Deputies of Legislature VIII of the Kingdom of Italy
Italian people of the Italian unification
Knights Grand Cross of the Order of Saints Maurice and Lazarus
Grand Croix of the Légion d'honneur